Ampara District is one of the 25 districts of Sri Lanka, the second-level administrative divisions of the country. The district is administered by a District Secretariat headed by a District Secretary (previously known as a Government Agent) appointed by the central government of Sri Lanka. The capital of the district is the town of Ampara. The district was carved out of the southern part of Batticaloa District in April 1961.

Geography 
Ampara District is located in the south east of Sri Lanka in the Eastern Province. It is bounded by Batticaloa and Polonnaruwa districts from north, Indian Ocean from east, Hambantota District from south, Badulla and Matale districts from northwest and by the Monaragala District from west and southeast.

The north-western panhandle of Ampara District (Dehiyattakandiya D.S. Division) is separated from the rest of the district and Eastern Province by the Maduru Oya Reservoir.

Demographics

Population 
Ampara District's population was 648,057 in 2012. The district is one of the most diverse in Sri Lanka, both ethnically and religiously.

The population of the district, like the rest of the east and north, was affected by the civil war. The war killed an estimated 100,000 people. Several hundred thousand Sinhalese move to west side of the country. Many Sri Lankan Tamils also moved to the relative safety of the capital Colombo. The war also caused many people from all ethnic and religious groups who lived in the district to flee to other parts of Sri Lanka, though most of them have returned to the district since the end of the civil war.

Ethnicity

Religion

Politics and government

Local government 
Ampara District has 20 local authorities of which two are Municipal Councils, one is an Urban Council and the remaining 17 are Divisional Councils (Pradesha Sabhai or Pradeshiya Sabha).

Administrative units 
Ampara District is divided into 20 Divisional Secretary's Division (DS Divisions), each headed by a Divisional Secretary (previously known as an Assistant Government Agent). The DS Divisions are further sub-divided into 507 Grama Niladhari Divisions (GN Divisions).

Notes

References

External links 

 Ampara District Secretariat

 
1961 establishments in Ceylon
Districts of Sri Lanka